Highway 931 is a provincial highway in the north-east region of the Canadian province of Saskatchewan. It runs from Highway 926 until it becomes a local road near the Snowfield Lakes. Highway 931 is about 5 km (3 mi) long.

See also 
Roads in Saskatchewan
Transportation in Saskatchewan

References 

931

cs:Saskatchewan Highway 926#Saskatchewan Highway 931